Makhzan ol-Asrar or Makhzan al-Asrar (The Treasury of Mysteries) is the title of a famous Mathnawi by the Persian poet Nizami Ganjavi (1141–1209). Makhzan ol-Asrar is the first poem collection in the main and best known work of Nizami Ganjavi called Khamsa of Nizami and one of the prominent examples of didactic literature. This Mathnawi has about 2,250 Persian distichs and it was completed at the age of forty of Nizami Ganjavi and since then it has always been considered one of the most important poetic and written works in Persian literature.

It starts with this distich:

Plot
The main theme of the book "Makhzan ol-Asrar" is to invite people to self-knowledge, theology and choosing good habits and behavior. Nizami Ganjavi has started the first verse of this work with the name and remembrance of God, and in the continuation, he has pointed to one of the main principles of mysticism and Sufism, namely the unity of God's existence and his obligatory existence. "Makhzan ol-Asrar" is full of mystical points and advice that are presented to the audience in the form of lyrical stories and literature; These concepts are sometimes difficult for the reader, and the verses often have complexity.

The concept of the "Makhzan ol-Asrar" can be categorized as follows, first about human neglect in the world, then about the discredit and instability of the world, then about man's relationship with God, fourth about social issues, and finally about politics and government.

Nizami says that when I wanted to sing "Makhzan ol-Asrar", archangel told me "you want to write poetry for people, so you should know what you want to sing. Therefore, refine yourself with your heart and follow your heart so that you can build yourself". Then Nizami says that I followed archangel's words and followed "the heart preceptor". From then on, he talks about the nights when he meditated with his heart. Those verses are very complex and beautiful at the same time. They may be considered the first surrealist texts in world literature. Because it speaks to issues that are similar to surrealist texts. He even goes so far as to say that "I went into my heart and saw his houses".

An excerpt
"Makhzan ol-Asrar" has 60 sections, the following poem is from section 15 titled "In describing the night and knowing the heart":

Date of composition
Since the book itself does not directly or indirectly mention the date of composition and also in other authoritative works the exact date of creation of this work is not mentioned, its date can not be determined with certainty; However, considering that Nezami gives other very accurate histories of the works, the age of the child and the material of other histories in his other works, as well as by examining the history of Azerbaijan and Arran, and comparative studies, it can be said that this work was created between 1165 and 1173 (probably close to 1173).

Dedication
Nizami Ganjavi, dedicated the book to "Fakhr al-Din Bahramshah", the governor of Erzincan at the time.

Translation
The book "Makhzan ol-Asrar" has been translated into English, Deutsch, Turkish and Kurdish languages.

See also
 Khosrow and Shirin
 Layla and Majnun
 Haft Peykar
 Al-Nijat

References

External links
 Makhzan ol-Asrar full text in Persian
 Nezami Ganjavi (The Great 12th Century Persian Poet)
 The New York Public Library "Makhzan al-asrār" and Its Importance
 Semiology of Nizami’ s States of Seclusion in Makhzan al-Asrar
 Nezami Ganjavi's approach to Parable of animals in Makhzan ol-'asrar: From a didactic point of view
 Makhzan al-Asrar Book by Nizami Ganjavi - ShopiPersia
 Makhzan al-Asrar manuscript
 Makhzan al-Asrar and Khamsah (quintet) of Niẓāmī Ganjavī manuscript

Poetry books
Nizami Ganjavi
Medieval Persian literature
Persian poetry
12th-century books
Persian poems
Historical poems